The Eastern Collegiate Women's Hockey League (ECWHL) is an American Collegiate Hockey Association Women's Division 1 club level hockey-only college athletic conference for women's hockey teams. It is one of four ACHA Women's Division 1 conferences, along with the Central Collegiate Women's Hockey Association, the Western Women's Collegiate Hockey League, and Women's Midwest College Hockey. Primarily, the league has been concentrated in New England and Upstate and Western New York, with eleven of its thirteen members over fourteen seasons based in those areas.

The University of Rhode Island has been the ECWHL's most successful program in conference play, winning nine playoff championships and nine regular season championships in 17 years. URI and Massachusetts are the only two founding members that have remained in the ECWHL throughout its entire existence, and both have frequently qualified for the ACHA's National Tournament - 12 and 15 times, respectively, while in the ECWHL. However, former member Northeastern University owns the league's sole ACHA National Championship, as the Huskies defeated the University of Minnesota in the final to win in 2011–12.

Current membership

Former members

Boston University (2003–2005)
University at Buffalo (2003–2008, 2009–2014)
Bates College (2004–2007)
Norwich University (2005–2007)
North Country Community College (2005–2007)
University of Connecticut (2006–2009)
State University of New York at Canton (2012–2013)
United States Naval Academy (2014–2015)
University of Vermont (2011–2017)
Northeastern University (2010–2017)

Notably, four ECWHL members have left the league in order to transition to NCAA varsity status. These alumni programs include Boston University and Penn State in NCAA Division I and Norwich and Canton in NCAA Division III. Penn State re-entered the ECWHL in 2014 with a separate ACHA Division 1 program. Buffalo, Connecticut, Navy, Vermont and Northeastern all departed while dropping to the ACHA's Division 2, where each remains today. Bates presently competes in the non-ACHA division of the Independent Women's Collegiate Hockey League. NCCC left for a non-ACHA conference, the Northeast Women's College Hockey Association, but has since ceased operations.

Membership timeline

Playoff championship game results 

Beginning with the 2006 playoffs, the previous season's champion serves as the host.

† Due to the small number of teams in the conference, the ECWHL's regular season winner was named its sole champion, by mutual agreement of the membership and the commissioner

Regular season champions

2003–04 Rhode Island
2004–05 Rhode Island
2005–06 Rhode Island
2006–07 Rhode Island
2007–08 Rhode Island
2008–09 Massachusetts
2009–10 Rhode Island
2010–11 Northeastern
2011–12 Penn State
2012–13 Massachusetts
2013–14 Rhode Island
2014–15 Massachusetts
2015–16 Rhode Island
2016–17 Massachusetts
2017–18 Rhode Island
2018–19 Massachusetts
2019–20 Massachusetts

ACHA National Tournament appearances

Appearances made while an ECWHL member. Former conference members are in italics.

World University Games selections

Since 2011, the American Collegiate Hockey Association has supplied players for the United States team at the World University Games women's hockey tournament, held biennially and as part of the multi-sport event for college and university student-athletes.

Notable ACHA award winners

See also
American Collegiate Hockey Association
Penn State Women's Ice Hockey Club
Rhode Island Rams women's ice hockey
UMass Minutemen women's ice hockey
List of ice hockey leagues

External links
UMass Women's Hockey
Penn State Women's Ice Hockey Club
URI Women's Ice Hockey

References

ACHA Division 1 conferences
3